A fixed asset, also known as long-lived assets or property, plant and equipment (PP&E), is a term used in accounting for assets and property that may not easily be converted into cash. Fixed assets are different from current assets, such as cash or bank accounts, because the latter are liquid assets. In most cases, only tangible assets are referred to as fixed.

While IAS 16 (International Accounting Standard) does not define the term "Fixed Asset", it is often colloquially considered a synonym for property, plant and equipment. According to IAS 16.6, property, plant and equipment are tangible items that: 
(a) are held for use in the production or supply of goods or services, for rental to others, or for administrative purposes and 
(b) are expected to be used during more than one period."

Fixed assets are  one of two types:
 "Freehold Assets" – assets which are purchased with legal right of ownership and used, and 
 "Leasehold Assets" – assets used by owner without legal right for a particular period of time.

A fixed asset can also be defined as an asset not directly sold to a firm's consumers or end-users.

Non-current assets
In modern financial accounting usage, the term "fixed assets" can be ambiguous.  Instead, the term "non-current assets" (used by the IFRS  and U.S. Generally Accepted Accounting Principles (GAAP) XBRL reporting taxonomies) is preferred when referring to assets that will not be liquidated in the current fiscal period.  Specific non-current assets (Property, plant and equipment, Investment property, Goodwill, Intangible assets other than goodwill, etc.) should be referred to by name.

A baking firm's current assets would be its inventory (flour, yeast, etc.), the value of sales owed to the firm from credit extended (i.e. debtors or accounts receivable), and cash held in the bank.  Its non-current assets would be the oven used to bake bread, motor vehicles used to transport deliveries, and cash registers used to handle cash payments. While these non-current assets have value, they are not directly sold to consumers and cannot be easily converted to cash.

Non-current (fixed) assets are items of value that the organization has bought and will use for an extended period of time, typically including land and buildings, motor vehicles, furniture, office equipment, computers, fixtures and fittings, and plant and machinery. These often receive a favorable tax treatment (in the form of a depreciation allowance) in contrast to short-term assets.

Note that the cost of a fixed asset is its purchase price including import duties, after subtracting any deductible trade discounts and rebates. It also includes the cost of transporting and installing the asset on-site and an estimate of the cost of dismantling and removal once it is no longer needed due to obsolescence or irreparable breakdown.

Accounting treatment
The primary objective of a business entity is to be profitable and increase the wealth of its owners. To do so, management must  exercise due care and diligence by matching the expenses for a given period with the revenues of the same period. The period of use of revenue generating assets is usually more than a year, i.e. long term. To accurately determine the Net Income (profit) for a period, incremental depreciation of the total value of the asset must be charged against the revenue of the same period. Doing so is necessary for determining Net Revenue.

Net book value of an asset is the difference between the historical cost of that asset and its associated depreciation. Under most financial accounting standards (Standard Accounting Statement (SAS) 3 and IAS 16), the value of fixed assets are recorded and reported at net book value. Also, carrying assets at net book value is the most meaningful way to capture asset values for the owners of the business and potential investors.

Depreciating a fixed asset
Depreciation is the expense generated by using an asset. It is the wear and tear and thus diminution in the historical value due to usage. It is also the cost of the asset less any salvage value over its estimated useful life. A fixed asset can be depreciated using the straight line method which is the most common form of depreciation.  Tax depreciation is commonly calculated differently than depreciation for financial reporting.

See also

Bentley Infrastructure 500
Capital asset
Depreciation
DIRTI 5
Fixed asset turnover
Fixed assets management
Fixed assets register
Like-kind exchange
Revaluation of fixed assets

References

 
Accounting terminology